The Idle Class is a 1921 American silent comedy film written and directed by Charlie Chaplin for First National Pictures.

Plot summary
The "Little Tramp" (Charlie Chaplin) heads to a resort for warm weather and golf. At the golf course, the Tramp's theft of balls in play causes one golfer (Mack Swain) to mistakenly attack another (John Rand). Meanwhile, a neglected wife (Edna Purviance) leaves her wealthy husband (also played by Chaplin) until he gives up drinking. When the Tramp is later mistaken for a pickpocket, he crashes a masquerade ball to escape from a policeman. There, he is mistaken for the woman's husband. Eventually, it is all straightened out, and the Tramp is once more on his way.

Review
Helen Rockwell of the New York Telegraph wrote, "...instead of going for a five-reel affair, he has returned to his first short love. But what there is of The Idle Class is so good and so funny that one realizes how much better is it to be entertained by two reels than bored in five."

Chaplin biographer Jeffrey Vance describes The Idle Class as “one of Chaplin’s funniest short comedies.” He notes that Chaplin began production on the film in January 1921 with the working title Vanity Fair: “Ultimately, Chaplin favored a more equivocal title—The Idle Class—for it is purposely not clear in the film which is the idle class: the idle rich or the idle poor. Chaplin plays both. The film took five months to complete, an amazingly long time for a two-reel comedy.” Vance speculates, “It is perhaps ironic that the story of The Idle Class centers on an unhappy marriage between an absent-minded husband and a lonely wife. This state of affairs could easily describe the principal characters of the tragi-comedy that was Chaplin’s own marriage. In the film Chaplin manages to dramatize the two sides of his own personality: Charlie the Tramp and the Absent-minded husband, rich and neglectful, absorbed to his own interests and indifferent to others. The latter was certainly how  Mildred Harris [his first wife] regarded Chaplin.”

Cast
 Charles Chaplin as Tramp / Husband
 Edna Purviance as Neglected Wife
 Mack Swain as Her Father
 Henry Bergman as Sleeping Hobo / Guest in Cop Uniform
 Al Ernest Garcia as Cop in Park / Guest
 John Rand as Golfer / Guest
 Rex Storey as Pickpocket / Guest
 Lita Grey as Guest

References

External links

1921 films
1921 comedy films
Silent American comedy films
American silent short films
American black-and-white films
Short films directed by Charlie Chaplin
1921 short films
Articles containing video clips
American comedy short films
First National Pictures films
1920s American films